Dr. Paul Jacob Bhatti is a Pakistani politician and well-known surgeon. He is the former federal minister in charge of National Harmony and Minorities Affairs. 
He served as a minister in the government of President of Pakistan Asif Ali Zardari.

Biography

Early life
He obtained his basic degree of Doctor in Medicine, and Surgery (MD) from the University of Padua in Italy.  He also attended the Université catholique de Louvain in Belgium. He received his post-graduation eq: FRCS from the University of Padua, and a Masters in Plastic and Cosmetic Surgery from the same university in 2008,

Medical career
He has been working as a surgeon in various hospitals of, Belgium, Netherlands, United Kingdom, France, Pakistan and currently Italy.

Politics

Dr. Paul Bhatti worked very closely with his late brother Shahbaz Bhatti to uplift the marginalized and oppressed sectors of the society. He is committed to promote religious freedom, human equality and social justice. He was the main advisor and financial supporter to Shahbaz Bhatti with his fight against all types of injustices in Pakistan.

After the assassination of his brother Shahbaz, Dr. Bhatti was offered a portfolio of Federal ministry of his brother and was elected Chairman of the All Pakistan Minorities Alliance, a movement founded by his late brother. He established the welfare organisations Shahbaz Bhatti Memorial Trust (SBMT) in Pakistan and Missione Shahbaz Bhatti (MSB) in Italy to continue the vision and the mission of his brother who was assassinated on 2 March 2012 by an extremist group in Islamabad. The SBMT was officially inaugurated by the President of Pakistan, Asif Ali Zardari.

During his position of Minister he has visited several countries of the world where he was welcomed and appreciated for his courageous work by head of states, political and religious leaders, human social activist in: Canada, US, UK, Germany, France,S.Korea, Spain, Hungary, Poland, Middle East, Asia. He held several seminars on Human Equality and religious persecution. In particularly he raised his voice in united nations, EU Parliament, UK house of common to support innocent Victims of violence. He helped to build welfare institutions: hospitals, schools, training centers (for job opportunities). He  always lauded religious freedom as a symbol of basic human right and dignity. He voiced a strong message of freedom and democracy in area Where basic human rights are very frequently violated.

In the course of his struggle, he supported and saved several innocent victims of violence and specially got involved in the protection of (Rimsha Masih blasphemy case) a girl of 14 years, putting his own life in risk. Rimsha was falsely accused of blasphemy by an imam of the area, who later was detained on 1 September 2012, for desecrating the Quran himself and tampering with evidence.

Dr.Bhatti's main focus is on political, social and economical stability in the country thus bringing a peaceful society, where people from diverse faiths can live together without fear. To achieve these objectives, he is working on the following:

Promotion of inter-religious dialogue and relationship among people of diverse faiths.
Promotion of education, especially the quality of education with the hope to eliminate all curriculum which is the cause of hate, discrimination and division in Pakistan among the majority and minority groups.
Economical empowerment of women and marginalised sectors of the community.
Equal and elected representation of Religious Minorities in all political forums of the country.
Community development.
Legal assistance and protection of innocent victims of hate crimes.

Within these areas of focus, Dr. Bhatti did the following:
Hosted and participated as a keynote speaker in several conferences both nationally and internationally, on religious freedom , education and terrorism mainly in Canada, France, Germany, Italy, Pakistan, Poland, Russia, Spain, Sri Lanka, United Kingdom, United States of America. He believes the elimination of poverty, religious terrorism and  extremism is the key objective to create peace and harmony in the world.

His main achievement are:
Awarded over 4000 scholarships to needy and talented students of all levels of education, studying at national and international institutions.
Repaired, renovated and newly constructed schools and religious institutions.
Established drinking water and irrigation projects for needy and disadvantaged communities.
Provided legal support and protection for innocent victims of hate crimes.
Established a justice and advocacy network.
Proposed to the Government of Pakistan to increase the number of seats for religious minorities in all political forums of the country.
Proposed the right of a dual voting system to the Government of Pakistan ensuring Religious Minorities that their representatives in the Provincial and Federal Parliament are elected.
Dr. Bhatti continues his struggle as Chairman of All Pakistan Minorities Alliance (APMA), Shahbaz Bhatti Memorial Trust (SBMT), Missione Shahbaz Bhatti. Further, he appealed to the international community to support his struggle to bring peace, harmony in the world and an end to the fear and violence. He established a  justice and advocacy network to uplift marginalized  sectors of society through inter-religious dialogue and relationship, education and economic empowerment.

On 22 October 2013, Dr. Paul Bhatti with Canadian High Commissioner to Pakistan Greg Giokas inaugurated a new solar-powered irrigation plant-irrigation in the village of Khushpur in Punjab. 

On 2 July 2014, Dr. Bhatti participated as keynote speaker at the event organised on the occasion of The United Nations International Day in Support of Victims of Torture and Other Cruel, Inhuman or Degrading Treatment or Punishment and To mark the beginning of the Italian Presidency of the European Union.

References

Living people
University of Padua alumni
Pakistani Roman Catholics
Federal ministers of Pakistan
Pakistani plastic surgeons
Year of birth missing (living people)